Bánh lọt is sweet rice pasta dessert in southern Vietnamese cuisine. It is made with rice, salt, tapioca flour, coconut milk, sugar and water. Bánh lọt is also used to make two types of chè: chè bánh lọt and chè đậu đỏ bánh lọt (used with red beans). It is believed to have been introduced to Vietnam from Thailand, where it is called lod chong.

See also
Cendol

References

Further reading
Vietnamese Wikipedia article on Bánh lọt

Vietnamese desserts
Foods containing coconut
Cassava dishes
Rice flour dishes
Vietnamese noodle dishes